The Pont de Rei is a bridge and border crossing over the river Garonne that connects the Aran Valley of Spain with the Haute-Garonne department of France.  The road on the French side is N125, ending in the commune of Fos; on the Spanish side the road is N-230, ending in the municipality of Bausen.

History
In 1515, the Plan d'Arem agreement was signed at the crossing between Spanish and French nobles and representatives to guarantee free passage and exchange of goods between the valleys on both sides of the border.  A festival was held and a monument erected in 2015 to commemorate the 500-year anniversary of the treaty. 

The border crossing was used by many Spanish refugees fleeing to France during the Spanish Civil War; and in the other direction by Jews fleeing the Nazi occupation of France. In 1944, the crossing was the point of entry and retreat for anti-Franco forces during the failed Invasion of Aran Valley.

References

France–Spain border crossings
Val d'Aran
Buildings and structures in Haute-Garonne
Transport in Occitania (administrative region)
Buildings and structures in the Province of Lleida